Chi A. Ossé (born March 18, 1998) is an American politician and activist from New York City who serves as a member of the New York City Council for the 36th district, which covers parts of central Brooklyn.

Early life and education
Ossé was born of Black and Chinese ancestry and raised in Brooklyn, where his family has lived for three generations. His father, hip hop attorney and journalist Reggie Ossé–better known as Combat Jack–died from cancer in 2017, when Ossé was 19. Ossé graduated from Friends Seminary in 2016 and attended but did not graduate from Chapman University in Orange, California.

Career
Ossé worked for several years in the entertainment industry. In May 2020, amid nationwide protests over the murder of George Floyd, Ossé became a prominent Black Lives Matter organizer and co-founded the activist collective Warriors in the Garden.

2021 City Council campaign
On Juneteenth 2020, Ossé announced his 2021 campaign to succeed term-limited Councilman Robert Cornegy in the 36th district of the New York City Council. Ossé, who acknowledged that he knew little about city government before the protests of spring 2020, cited police brutality and the Black Lives Matter movement as the impetus for his campaign, and charged that the City Council and Mayor Bill de Blasio had not done enough to reshape policing in the city.

With endorsements from the Working Families Party and Congresswoman Alexandria Ocasio-Cortez's Courage to Change PAC, Ossé was seen as the furthest-left candidate in a field that also included district leader Henry Butler, local political operative Tahirah Moore, and pastor Robert Waterman. His campaign also found an unusual niche due to Ossé's youth and personal style, with many non-political publications interviewing Ossé and running profiles of his campaign.

On election night on June 22, Ossé led the field with 37 percent of the vote; when absentee ballots and ranked-choice votes were counted, he defeated Butler 57-43%. His victory, and the size of his margin, was seen as a considerable upset, given his opponents' more traditional political backgrounds and endorsements. Ossé faced minimal opposition in the November general election, and won easily, becoming the council's youngest ever member.

Personal life
Ossé is openly queer. He lives in Crown Heights, and is a practicing Nichiren Buddhist.

He is a former member of the Democratic Socialists of America.

See also
 Chinese people in New York City
 LGBT culture in New York City
 List of LGBT people from New York City

References

Living people
1998 births
American politicians of Haitian descent
American politicians of Chinese descent
People from Crown Heights, Brooklyn
Politicians from Brooklyn
American LGBT city council members
LGBT people from New York (state)
LGBT African Americans
New York (state) Democrats
Black Lives Matter people
American democratic socialists
New York (state) socialists
African-American activists
Queer men
21st-century LGBT people